The Girl From Nantucket is a two-act comedy musical with lyrics by Kay Twomey and music by Jacques Belasco. The musical's book, by Paul Stamford, Harold Sherman and Hi Cooper, is based on a story by Fred Thompson and Bernie Giler.

Productions 
The show premiered at the Forrest Theatre in Philadelphia in October 1945. It opened on Broadway at the Adelphi Theatre on November 8, 1945 where it closed on November 17 after 12 performances. 

The production starred Adelaide Bishop as Betty Ellis, Jane Kean as Dodey Ellis, and Helen Raymond as Keziah Getchel.

Reception 
The Girl from Nantucket was negatively reviewed by critics, including the New York Post and Time Magazine.

Musical numbers

Act l 

 I Want to See More of You (Betty Ellis and Michael Nicolson)
 Take the Steamer to Nantucket (Vacationists and Guides) 
 What's He Like? (Betty Ellis, Dodey Ellis and Girls) 
 What's a Sailor Got? (Captain Matthew Ellis and Ensemble) 
 Magnificent Failure* (Dick Oliver) 
 Hurray for Nicoletti (Dick Oliver and Ensemble) 
 When a Hick Chick Meets a City Slicker (Dodey Ellis and Dick Oliver) 
 Your Fatal Fascination (Betty Ellis, Michael Nicolson, Dance Specialists, Ann Ellis and Ensemble) 
 Let's Do and Say We Didn't* (Dodey Ellis and Girls) 
 Nothing Matters (Mary and Girls) 
 Sons of the Sea (Tom Andrews and Fishermen)

Act ll 

 Isn't It a Lovely View? (Betty Ellis and Vacationists) 
 Isn't It a Lovely View? (Reprise) (Betty Ellis) 
 From Morning Till Night (Betty Ellis and Michael Nicolson) 
 I Love That Boy (Dodey Ellis and Dick Oliver) 
 From Morning Till Night (Reprise) (Michael Nicolson) 
 Hammock in the Blue (Betty Ellis, Michael Nicolson and Ensemble) 
 Boukra Fill Mish Mish (Captain Matthew Ellis, Solo Dancer and Ensemble)

*Music and lyrics by Hughie Prince and Dick Rogers

Cast

References 

1945 musicals
Broadway musicals